Chad James Connell (born May 20, 1983) is a Canadian actor.

Connell is a graduate of Ryerson University (now Toronto Metropolitan University)'s theatre program in Toronto. He began acting in local productions in Ottawa at the age of 11. His first starring role was the role of Oliver in the musical of the same name. He played the role of Zakhar in the premiere Jason Sherman's adaptation of Gorky's Enemies while at university.

Connell has appeared in Degrassi: The Next Generation, Wild Roses, Prom Wars and Hallmark Channel's Taking a Chance on Love, as well as Lifetime's Double Wedding with Tia Mowry and Tamera Mowry. He appeared as the demon Lambert in the 2013 release of The Mortal Instruments, as well as the vampire Quinn on the television series adaptation, Shadowhunters.

In 2018, Connell recurred on Mike Clattenburg's CBC Comedy series Crawford, as the boyfriend to Jill Hennessy's character.

Connell will star alongside Tiya Sircar in the May 2019 Netflix Original movie Good Sam, based on the book by Dete Meserve.

Personal life 
Aside from acting, Chad Connell has a keen interest in wine and owns a wine importing agency dealing in natural wines.  He is openly gay.

Filmography

References

External links
 

1983 births
20th-century Canadian male actors
21st-century Canadian male actors
Canadian gay actors
Male actors from Ottawa
Canadian male film actors
Canadian male stage actors
Canadian male television actors
Living people
21st-century Canadian LGBT people
20th-century Canadian LGBT people